"Atlanta Burned Again Last Night" is a song recorded by American country music group Atlanta. It was released in May 1983 as their debut single and the first from their debut album Pictures. The song reached No. 9 on the U.S. Billboard Hot Country Singles chart It was written by Jeff Stevens, Terry Dotson and Dwaine Rowe. Released through Larry McBride's MDJ label, it was one of the highest-charting debut singles by an independently signed country act.

Content
The song visits a common theme in country music: a teenaged boy's sexual initiation by a married woman. Here, a 17-year-old boy (depicted as "dating a high school queen") meets and begins a relationship with a woman who is "over 30," in her second marriage and having a son that was nearly as old as her teenaged partner. The lyrics focused on the intimacy shared between the two, which in the process met her needs and turned him into a man ("He made her feel needed/And she made him a man").

Chart performance

References

1983 debut singles
Atlanta (band) songs
Songs written by Jeff Stevens (singer)
1983 songs
Songs about Georgia (U.S. state)